André Boullanger (1578–1657), more commonly known as petit Père André ("little Father André"), was a French Roman Catholic monk and preacher of the reformed order of Augustines.

Life 
André Boullanger was born at Paris in 1578. He was the son of a President of the Parlement (High Court) of Paris. At an early age he entered the Augustinian Order and became a well-known preacher, being heard for over half a century in most of the great pulpits of France. He preached for fifty-five years and gained a wide reputation. His singularity consisted in a habit of interspersing his sermons with a few droll expressions, in order, as he said, to keep his hearers awake. He died at Paris on 27 September 1657.

Works 
Boulanger lived at a period when the jocose style of preaching, introduced by such men as Menot and Maillard, still lingered, and he made large use of the burlesque in his own preaching. It is indeed this habit of jesting that has preserved his name. Boileau refers to Boulanger when, speaking of trivial plays on words and witticisms, he writes:

Father André's style of preaching may be judged from the following example. In one of his passages he thus compared the four first Doctors of the Latin Church to the kings of the four suits of cards: Saint Augustine to the King of Hearts, because of his large-heartedness; Saint Ambrose to the King of Clubs (trèfle, "clover"), on account of his flowery eloquence; Saint Jerome to the King of Spades (pique, "lance"), because of his biting style; Saint Gregory the Great to the King of Diamonds (carreau, in the sense of "foot-stool") on account of his lowliness of thought. However, according to the Catholic Encyclopedia, this exaggeration of speech was but one side, and that the least important one, of Father André's eloquence. Tallemant des Réaux said: "He was a good member of his order and had a large following of all sorts of people; some came to laugh, others came because he moved them." The critic Guéret, who had head the facetious monk, represents him, in a dialogue of the dead, as saying in his own defence against his accuser Cardinal du Perron: "Joker as you take him to be, he has not always made those laugh who heard him; he has said truths which have sent bishops back into their dioceses. He has found the art of stinging while laughing." The Regent Anne of Austria and the Prince of Condé enjoyed his sermons. Boulanger was several times provincial of his order and much occupied in other ways; consequently he was not able to attend to the printing of his works. Many of his manuscripts entered the convent of Queen Margaret, but the following funeral oration for Marie of Lorraine was published: Oraison Funebre de Marie' de Lorraine, Abbesse de Chelles (Paris, 1627).

Notes

References

Sources 

 Guéret, Gabriel (1671). La guerre des auteurs anciens et modernes. Paris: Theodore Girard. p. 152.
 Jacquinet, P. (1885). Des Prédicateurs du XVIIe siècle avant Bossuet. 2nd ed. Paris: Vve Eugène Belin et Fils. pp. 304–306.
 McClintock, John; Strong, James, eds. (1885). "Boullanger, Andre". Cyclopædia of Biblical, Theological and Ecclesiastical Literature. Supplement 1. New York: Harper & Brothers. p. 580.
 Réaux, Gédéon Tallemant des (1834). Les historiettes de Tallemant des Réaux: mémoires pour servir à l'histoire du XVIIe siècle. Vol. 3. Paris: Alphonse Levavasseur. pp. 321–332.
 

1578 births
1657 births
17th-century French writers
17th-century monks